Berea is a neighborhood in the East District of Baltimore. Its boundaries are the south side of Sinclair Lane, the east side of Milton Avenue, the west side of Edison Highway, and the north side of Biddle Street. Berea lies between the neighborhoods of Broadway East (west) and Orangeville (east), north of the Biddle Street neighborhood and south of Four By Four.

Though the area is considered middle class with African Americans being the majority of the population. The houses and lawns are well keep in this quiet clean neighborhood. A filming location for The Wire, a Baltimore-based HBO drama,

See also
List of Baltimore neighborhoods

References

External links

Baltimore '68: Riots and Rebirth Overview. Langsdale Library Special Collections. University of Baltimore.

African-American history in Baltimore
East Baltimore
Neighborhoods in Baltimore
Poverty in Maryland
Working-class culture in Baltimore